The Port de Larrau (Puerto de Larrau) (elevation ) is a mountain pass on the France – Spain border in the western Pyrenees between the department of Pyrénées-Atlantiques, France and Navarre, Spain. The climb from the French side was used in the 2007 Tour de France.

In the Basque language the pass is known as Uthurzehetako Lepoua.

Details of the climb 
The pass is situated south east of Saint-Jean-Pied-de-Port.

Tour de France 
The climb first appeared in the Tour de France in 1996, when it became the final Tour de France climb to be ridden by five-times race winner Miguel Indurain, who lost out heavily here.

The climb from the south featured in the 2007 Tour de France on the  stage 16 from Orthez to Gourette Col d'Aubisque.  This was probably the hardest climb in the 2007 Tour, sustaining almost the same gradient as the Col de Menté, but twice as long.

Appearances in Tour de France

References

External links
Detailed summary of climb

Mountain passes of Nouvelle-Aquitaine
Mountain passes of the Pyrenees
Mountain passes of Spain
France–Spain border crossings